Arthur Suydam (born May 18, 1953) is an American comic book artist known for his work on Marvel Zombies, Deadpool, Black Panther, and KISS Zombies. He has done artwork for magazines including Heavy Metal, Epic Illustrated and National Lampoon, while his comic book work includes Batman, Conan, Tarzan, Predator, Aliens, Death Dealer, and Marvel Zombies.

Early life
Arthur Suydam was born May 18, 1953. His great-uncle, John Suydam, was an artist in the 19th-century Hudson River School of painting. He began drawing at age four, and while in high school, discovered a collection of workbooks from the Famous Artists Correspondence Course, from which he discovered Albert Dorne and Norman Rockwell, who became his early influences. A reader of comics throughout his life, he was also inspired by the art of Frank Frazetta and Graham Ingels.

Career
Suydam's first published work appeared in Warren Publishing's Creepy magazine.

Suydam has contributed work to many publications, House of Secrets, House of Mystery, Epic Illustrated and National Lampoon, as well as international sci-fi and comic anthologies.

Suydam's creator-owned projects include Mudwogs and Mudwogs II, which first appeared in Heavy Metal magazine, and The Adventures of Cholly and Flytrap.

In 1993 Suydam joined the editorial staff of the  anthology magazine Penthouse Comix. In addition to creating  his "Libby in the Lost World" series to the publication, he also served as colorist on other contributors' contributions, and as an adviser to editors George Caragonne and Bob Guccione in selecting contributors to the magazine.

Suydam's other creator-owned work includes Arthur Suydam: The Art of the Barbarian, Skin Deep, The Alien Encounters Poster Book, Visions: The Art of Arthur Suydam, and Bedtime Stories for the Incarcerated.

Arthur Suydam's comic book work includes such titles as Batman, Conan, Tarzan, Predator, Aliens and Death Dealer. His cover work includes Marvel Zombies, Ghost Rider, Hellstorm, Moon Knight, Wolverine, Marvel Zombies vs. The Army of Darkness, and Raise the Dead.

Suydam created the box art for the game Touch the Dead, and provided the cover art to the Mickey Spillane (with Max Allan Collins) novel Dead Street. He has also done cover artwork for the horror punk band the Misfits, including their 2009 single "Land of the Dead" and 2011 album The Devil's Rain. He has also done several album covers for The Misfits.

Suydam's subsequent work includes Kiss Zombies and Red Sonja vs. Mars Attacks for Dynamite Publishing.

Cover work

Marvel Comics homage covers
The cover of each issue of the Marvel Zombies-related book is a homage cover of a famous cover from Marvel history, featuring zombie versions of the characters.

Marvel Zombies #1, 1st printing – Amazing Fantasy #15, by Steve Ditko
Marvel Zombies #1, 2nd printing – Spider-Man #1, by Todd McFarlane
Marvel Zombies #1, 3rd printing – The Amazing Spider-Man #50, by John Romita, Sr.
Marvel Zombies #1, 4th printing – The Incredible Hulk #1, by Jack Kirby
Marvel Zombies #2 – Avengers #4, by Jack Kirby
Marvel Zombies #3, 1st printing – The Incredible Hulk #340, by Todd McFarlane
Marvel Zombies #3, 2nd printing – Daredevil #179, by Frank Miller
Marvel Zombies #4, 1st printing – X-Men #1, by Jack Kirby
Marvel Zombies #4, 2nd printing – Amazing Spider-Man #39, by John Romita, Sr.
Marvel Zombies #5, 1st printing – Amazing Spider-Man Annual #21, by John Romita, Sr.
Marvel Zombies #5, 2nd printing – Silver Surfer #1, by John Buscema
Marvel Zombies collection, 1st printing – Secret Wars #1, by Mike Zeck
Marvel Zombies collection, 2nd printing – Amazing Spider-Man #316, by Todd McFarlane
Marvel Zombies collection, 3rd printing – Fantastic Four #49, by Jack Kirby
Marvel Zombies collection, 4th printing – Avengers #1, by Jack Kirby
Marvel Zombies collection, 5th printing – Mary Jane #2, by Takeshi Miyazawa
Marvel Zombies collection, 6th printing is a homage to Iron Man #128, by Bob Layton
Ultimate Fantastic Four #30 (variant cover) – Fantastic Four #1, by Jack Kirby
Ultimate Fantastic Four #31 (variant cover) – Fantastic Four #51, by Jack Kirby
Ultimate Fantastic Four #32 (variant cover), is a homage to Fantastic Four #8, by Jack Kirby
Marvel Zombies: Dead Days – X-Men vol. 2 #1, by Jim Lee.
Marvel Zombies vs Army of Darkness #1, 1st printing – X-Men #141, by John Byrne
Marvel Zombies vs Army of Darkness #1, 2nd printing – X-Men #137, by John Byrne
Marvel Zombies vs Army of Darkness #1, 3rd printing – Captain America #1, by Jack Kirby
Marvel Zombies vs Army of Darkness #2 – X-Men #268, by Jim Lee
Marvel Zombies vs Army of Darkness #3, 1st printing – Superman vs. the Amazing Spider-Man, by Dick Giordano
Marvel Zombies vs Army of Darkness #3, 2nd printing – The Death of Captain Marvel graphic novel, by Jim Starlin
Marvel Zombies vs Army of Darkness #4 – Captain America #100, by Syd Shores
Marvel Zombies vs Army of Darkness #5 – Wolverine #1 (1982), by Frank Miller
Black Panther #27 – Fantastic Four #3, by Jack Kirby
Black Panther #28 – Fantastic Four #116, by John Buscema
Black Panther #29 – Avengers #87, by John Buscema
Black Panther #30 – Fantastic Four #4, by Jack Kirby
Marvel Zombies Poster Book is a homage to Secret Wars #8 by Mike Zeck
Marvel Zombies 2 #1 — the variant cover of Civil War #1, by Michael Turner
Marvel Zombies 2 #2 – Marvel Comics #1, by Frank Paul
Marvel Zombies 2 #3 – Tales of Suspense #39 by Don Heck
Marvel Zombies 2 #4 – Nick Fury, Agent of SHIELD #4, by Jim Steranko
Marvel Zombies 2 #5 – Silver Surfer #4, by John Buscema

Other homage covers for Marvel
Deadpool: Merc with a Mouth #1 – Savage Tales #1 comic cover
Deadpool: Merc with a Mouth #2 – Jaws movie poster
Deadpool: Merc with a Mouth #3 – Dawn of the Dead movie poster
Deadpool: Merc with a Mouth #4 – Scarface (1983) movie poster
Deadpool: Merc with a Mouth #5 – Pretty Woman movie poster
Deadpool: Merc with a Mouth #6 – Alien movie poster
Deadpool: Merc with a Mouth #7 – Trainspotting movie poster
Deadpool: Merc with a Mouth #8 – One Million Years B.C. movie poster
Deadpool: Merc with a Mouth #9 – The Graduate movie poster
Deadpool: Merc with a Mouth #10 – Frank Miller's Wolverine #1 coverDeadpool: Merc with a Mouth #11 – Lone Wolf and Cub manga coverDeadpool: Merc with a Mouth #12 – Nirvana – Nevermind album coverDeadpool: Merc with a Mouth #13 – Silence of the Lambs movie cover

Other Marvel coversAmazing Spider-Girl #13 'Zombie' VariantAvengers/Invaders #9 VariantFantastic Four #554 'Skrull' VariantGhost Rider #08Ghost Rider #09Ghost Rider #10Ghost Rider #11Ghost Rider #30Ghost Rider #31Ghost Rider #32Ghost Rider #33Ghost Rider #34Ghost Rider #35Incredible Hercules #121Incredible Hercules #122 'Zombie' VariantMoon Knight #14 (3rd series, 2006)Moon Knight #15Moon Knight #16Moon Knight #17Moon Knight #18Moon Knight #19Moon Knight #21Moon Knight #22Moon Knight #23Moon Knight #24Moon Knight #25Rawhide Kid #4Thor #1 VariantThor #1 'Zombie' VariantWolverine #57Wolverine #58Wolverine #59Wolverine #60Wolverine #61Wolverine Origins'' #10 Variant

Notes

References

Arthur Suydam at Lambiek

External links

 

Living people
1953 births
American people of Dutch descent
American comics artists
American comics writers